8-Azaguanine is a purine analog with the chemical formula C4H4N6O. It has been widely studied for its biological activity. It shows antineoplastic activity and has been used in the treatment of acute leukemia.

Use in chemotherapy
The compound closely resembles guanine and appears to be competitive with it in the metabolism of living organisms. It has been shown to cause retardation of some malignant neoplasms when administered to tumors in animals. 8-Azaguanine was the first purine analogue discovered to inhibit experimental tumors in mice.

Synonyms

 2-Amino-6-hydroxy-8-azapurine
 2-Amino-6-oxy-8-azapurine
 5-Amino-1,4-dihydro-7H-1,2,3-triazolo(4,5-d)pyrimidin-7-one
 5-Amino-1,6-dihydro-7H-v-triazolo(4,5-d)pyrimidin-7-one
 5-Amino-1H-triazolo(4,5-d)pyrimidin-7-ol
 5-Amino-1H-v-triazolo(d)pyrimidin-7-ol
 5-Amino-1H-(1,2,3)Triazolo(4,5-d)pyrimidin-7-ol
 5-Amino-7-hydroxy-1H-v-triazolo(d)pyrimidine
 7H-1,2,3-Triazolo(4,5-d)pyrimidin-7-one, 5-amino-1,4-dihydro- (9CI)
 7H-1,2,3-Triazolo(4,5-d)pyrimidinone, 5-amino-1,4-dihydro-
 7H-v-Triazolo(4,5-d)pyrimidin-7-one, 5-amino-1,6-dihydro-
 8 AG
 8azaG
 Azaguanine
 Azaguanine-8
 Azan
 AZG
 B-28
 Guanazol
 Guanazolo
 NSC-749
 Pathocidin
 Pathocidine
 SF-337
 SK 1150
 Triazologuanine
 v-Triazolo(4,5-d)pyrimidin-7-ol,5-amino-

* Sources:

References

External links
 Digital renderings of the molecule
 Some derivatives and similar molecules
 Web-based 3D viewer with the molecule
 "CAS: 134-58-7" on ChemCAS
 "Azaguanine" on the Merck Index
 "Azaguanine" (CID 8646) on PubChem

Triazolopyrimidines
Experimental cancer drugs